Osvetnik (Avenger) was the first of the  diesel-electric submarines built by Ateliers et Chantiers de la Loire, Nantes, France for the navy of the Kingdom of Serbs, Croats and Slovenes (later Yugoslavia). She was launched in 1929, and was built to a partial double hull Simonot design similar to the French s.

Prior to World War II she participated in several cruises to Mediterranean ports. During the German-led Axis invasion of Yugoslavia in April 1941, she was captured by Italian forces at the Bay of Kotor. Initially designated N1, her armament was changed and her conning tower modified. Due to her age and shallow diving depth, when she was commissioned into the Royal Italian Navy as Francesco Rismondo; her service was limited to training and experimentation. She was scuttled off the island of Corsica by the Germans shortly after her capture in September 1943 following the Italian surrender.

Description and construction
Yugoslav naval policy in the interwar period lacked direction until the mid-1920s, although it was generally accepted that the Adriatic coastline was effectively a sea frontier that the naval arm was responsible for securing with the limited resources made available to it. In 1926, a modest ten-year construction program was initiated to build up a force of submarines, coastal torpedo boats, torpedo bombers and conventional bomber aircraft to perform this role. The Osvetnik-class submarines were one of the acquisitions aimed at developing a naval force capable of meeting this challenge.

Osvetnik was built for the Kingdom of Serbs, Croats and Slovenes (later Yugoslavia) by the Ateliers et Chantiers de la Loire company (ACL) at Nantes, France. Her partial double hull design, was based on plans by ACL's chief engineer, G. Simonot, and was similar to the French s. Her Serbo-Croatian name translates as "Avenger".

For surface running, the Osvetnik-class boats were powered by two MAN (Maschinenfabrik) diesel engines which were rated at  that drove two propeller shafts. When submerged, the propellers were driven by two Nancy electric motors generating . They were armed with six  torpedo tubes (four bow-mounted, two stern-mounted), one  gun, and one  anti-aircraft gun.

Service history
Osvetnik was the first of her class, and the third submarine of the navy of the Kingdom of Serbs, Croats and Slovenes, which subsequently became the Royal Yugoslav Navy. She was launched on 14 January 1929. She and her sister submarine Smeli arrived in the Bay of Kotor on 9 December 1929. In 1932, the British naval attaché reported that Yugoslav ships engaged in few exercises, manoeuvres or gunnery training due to reduced budgets. In September 1933, Osvetnik and the British-designed submarine  cruised the southern part of the central Mediterranean. In August 1935, Osvetnik visited Malta, this time in company with the British-designed submarine . In August 1936, Nebojša and Osvetnik visited the Greek island of Corfu.

When the German-led Axis invasion of Yugoslavia began on 6 April 1941, she was located in the Bay of Kotor on the southern Adriatic coast along with the three other submarines of the Submarine Division. On 10 April, Osvetnik and Hrabri received orders for an operation against the Italian enclave of Zara on the Dalmatian coastline, but the mission did not proceed. On 17 April, she was captured by the Italian XVII Corps at the Bay of Kotor.

Still in good condition, she was taken as war booty, and initially designated N1 by the Royal Italian Navy. She was refitted and modernised at Pola in the upper Adriatic, which involved the replacement of some of her armament and modifications to her conning tower. She was commissioned by the Italians as the  Francesco Rismondo, named after Francesco Rismondo, a Dalmatian-born Italian hero of World War I. Despite her submerged stability and good diving rate of 35 seconds, her age and shallow diving depth meant that she was only used for training and experimentation. Shortly after the Italian surrender, she was captured by the Germans on 14 September 1943 at Bonifacio at the southern tip of the island of Corsica, and they scuttled her four days later.

See also 
List of ships of the Royal Yugoslav Navy

Footnotes

References

Books

 
 
 
 
 
 
 

1929 ships
World War II submarines of Yugoslavia
World War II submarines of Italy
Submarines of the Royal Yugoslav Navy
Osvetnik-class submarine
Ships built in France
Naval ships of Yugoslavia captured by Italy during World War II
Naval ships of Italy captured by Germany during World War II
Scuttled vessels
Maritime incidents in September 1943